Allan Thigo is a former Kenya international football midfielder.

Career
Born in Kenya, Thigo began playing club football for local side Kisumu Hot Stars at age 18. He spent most of his playing career with Gor Mahia F.C., helping the club reach the final of the 1979 African Cup Winners' Cup.

Thigo made 81 appearances for the senior Kenya national football team, including two FIFA World Cup qualifying matches, and he played at the 1972 African Cup of Nations finals.

After Thigo retired from playing football, he became a coach. He has managed Gor Mahia.

He is now coaching the Africa Nazarene University football team!

References

External links

Profile at Safaricom

Year of birth missing (living people)
Living people
Kenyan footballers
Kenya international footballers
1972 African Cup of Nations players
Gor Mahia F.C. players
Association football midfielders